The 2013–14 Iranian Futsal 1st Division will be divided into two phases.

The league will also be composed of 18 teams divided into two divisions of 9 teams each, whose teams will be divided geographically. Teams will play only other teams in their own division, once at home and once away for a total of 14 matches each.

Teams

Group A 

1 Heyat Football Qazvin Renamed to Keshavarz Qazvin

Group B

League standings

Group A

Group B

Results table

Group A

Group B

Clubs season-progress

Play-off 

Winner Promoted to the Super League. 
1 Eisatis Yazd withdrew after 1st leg.

First leg

Return leg

See also 
 2013–14 Iranian Futsal Super League
 2014 Iran Futsal's 2nd Division
 2013–14 Iranian Futsal Hazfi Cup
 2013–14 Persian Gulf Cup
 2013–14 Azadegan League
 2013–14 Iran Football's 2nd Division
 2013–14 Iran Football's 3rd Division
 2013–14 Hazfi Cup
 Iranian Super Cup

References

External links 
   فوتسال نیوز 
  I.R. Iran Football Federation

Iran Futsal's 1st Division seasons
2013–14 in Iranian futsal leagues